Tcell is a mobile network brand in Tajikistan, owned and operated by the Tajik company Indigo Tajikistan, owned by AKFED (Aga Khan Fund for Economic Development).

The Tcell network offers mobile telephony and mobile internet services in Tajikistan using GSM, UMTS, HSPA and LTE technologies.

On 6 August 2020, they switched on its first 5G base stations connected to its live mobile network in central Dushanbe.

References

External links 
 

Communications in Tajikistan
Companies of Tajikistan
Aga Khan Development Network